This is the results breakdown of the local elections held in Aragon on 3 April 1979. The following tables show detailed results in the autonomous community's most populous municipalities, sorted alphabetically.

Overall

City control
The following table lists party control in the most populous municipalities, including provincial capitals (shown in bold).

Municipalities

Calatayud
Population: 17,599

Huesca
Population: 38,095

Teruel
Population: 24,590

Zaragoza
Population: 555,424

References

Aragon
1979